The Newhall House Hotel Fire (January 10, 1883) is the deadliest fire ever to have affected the city of Milwaukee, Wisconsin.  At least 70 people perished in the fire. Survivors of the fire included General Tom Thumb and his wife Lavinia Warren, who were carried out of the building under the arm of a Milwaukee firefighter. Other survivors were William Edward Cramer, founder of The Evening Wisconsin, and his wife, Harriet.

See also
 List of building or structure fires

References

History of Milwaukee
1883 in Wisconsin